Linda Aronson (born 20 March 1950) is a British-born Australian screenwriter, educator and author. She wrote the AACTA-nominated drama Kostas and several television series, such as Something in the Air and G.P.

Born in London, Aronson moved out to Essex at a young age. She studied at Ulster University, then did late nineteenth century fiction at Oxford University, but abandoned it to pursue a career as a writer. Her first paid writing job was a 1973 radio adaptation of her own stage play, Closing Down for ABC. This was followed by Cafe in a Side Street in 1975, and The Fall Guy in 1976. The latter success lead to her writing Kostas.

The 21st Century Screenplay 
Aronson is also a prolific author, having written several books including the screenwriting guide The 21st Century Screenplay. The book was written as a response to standard screenwriting teaching that focused on linear, single protagonist stories. Aronson, instead, discusses how to write for non-linear stories with multiple characters.

References

External links 

1950 births
Living people
Australian people of British descent
Australian women screenwriters
British women screenwriters
Screenwriting instructors
Writers of books about writing fiction